Avdeyevo is a rural locality (a village) and the administrative center of Avdeyevskoye Rural Settlement of Pudozhsky District, Republic of Karelia, Russia. The population was 361 as of 2013.

Geography 
Avdeyevo is located 36 km northwest of Pudozh (the district's administrative centre) by road. Burakovo is the nearest rural locality.

References 

Rural localities in the Republic of Karelia
Pudozhsky District